Welle Priory was a priory in Gayton, in Norfolk, England.

References

Monasteries in Norfolk